This is an incomplete list of Hungarian sculptors. For painters see List of Hungarian painters

A
 Makrisz Agamemnon (1913–1993)
 Károly Antal (1909–1994)
 Maurice Ascalon

B
 Károly Bebo (1712–1779)
 András Beck (1911–1985)
 Fülöp Ö. Beck (1873–1945)
 István Beöthy (1897-1961)
 Lajos Berán
 László Beszédes (1874 - 1922)
 Miklós Borsos (1906–1990)
 Jeno Bory (1879–1959)

C
 Heinrich Charasky (1656 - 1710)
 Joseph Csaky (József Csáky) (1888–1971)
 Marianne Csaky (1959–)

D
 Gyula Donáth (1850–1909)
 Orshi Drozdik (1946-)

E
 Erzsébet Schaár (1908–1975)

F
 János Fadrusz (1858–1903)
 Sándor Boldogfai Farkas (1907–1970)
 Béni Ferenczy (1890–1967)
 István Ferenczy (1792–1856)
 Magda Frank (1914-2010)

H
 János Horvay (1873-1944)

I
 Miklós Izsó (1831–1875)

K
 Ede Kallós (1866–1950)
 János Kass (1927–2010)
 András Kocsis (1905–1976)
 Sámuel Kornél (1883–1914)
 Margit Kovács (1902–1977)
 László Kutas (1936-)

L
 Petri Lajos (1884–1963)
 László Lakner (1936–)
 Miklós Ligeti (1871–1944)

M
 Géza Maróti (1875–1941)
 László Marton (1925–2008)
 Ferenc Medgyessy (1881–1958)
 Gustave Miklos (1888–1967)
 Ödön Moiret (1883–1968)

P
 János Pásztor (1881–1945)
 Pál Pátzay (1896–1979)
 Lajos Petri (1884–1963)

R
 József Reményi (1887–1977)
 József Róna (1861-1939)

S
 Mihály Schéner (1923–2009)
 Mihály Schéner (1949–)
 Alajos Stróbl (1856–1926)
 Zsigmond Kisfaludi Stróbl (1884–1975)
 István Szentgyörgyi (1881–1938)
 László Szlávics, Jr. (1959–)

T
 Eduard Telcs (1872–1948)
 Amerigo Tot (Tóth Imre) (1909–1984)

V
 Imre Varga (1923–2019)
 György Vastagh (1868–1946)

W
 Nándor Wagner (1922–1997)
 József Lénárd Wéber (1702–1773)

Z
 György Zala (1858–1937)
 Rudolf Züllich (1813–1890)

See also
List of Hungarians
List of sculptors

References

Sculptors
Hungarian sculptors
Hungarian